William Trayton Jackson (May 8, 1876 – October 3, 1933) was an American politician.  He served as mayor of Toledo, Ohio between 1928 and 1931.

Sources
The Political Graveyard

External links
 

1876 births
1933 deaths
Mayors of Toledo, Ohio